WWTW (channel 34) is a religious television station licensed to Senatobia, Mississippi, United States, serving the Memphis, Tennessee area as an owned-and-operated station of Tri-State Christian Television (TCT). It has common ownership with religious independent WTWV (channel 23). WWTW and WTWV share studios on Kirby Whitten Road in the northeast section of Memphis; through a channel sharing agreement, the two stations transmit using WTWV's spectrum from a tower in Ellendale, Tennessee.

Until 2018, WWTW's transmitter was located near Arkabutla Lake in northwestern Tate County, Mississippi. To expand its coverage area, the station was simulcast on WTWV's second digital subchannel.

History 
WWTW signed on the air as an independent station on December 7, 2010. Branded as ACME Classics TV, the station mainly aired classic television shows, mostly public domain content.

On May 28, 2020, Flinn Broadcasting Corporation announced that it would sell WWTW and WTWV, along with sister stations KCWV in Duluth, Minnesota, WWJX in Jackson, Mississippi, WBIH in Selma, Alabama, and WFBD in Destin, Florida, to Marion, Illinois–based Tri-State Christian Television for an undisclosed price pending Federal Communications Commission (FCC) approval. The stations would become owned-and-operated stations of the TCT network and the second and third full-power religious stations in the Memphis area.

References

External links
Official website

 

WTW
Television channels and stations established in 2010
2010 establishments in Mississippi
Tate County, Mississippi
Tri-State Christian Television affiliates